Lions de l'Atakory Football Club is a football club of Benin, playing in the town of Cotonou. They play in the Beninese Second division, the Benin Second Division.

In 1984 the team has won the Benin Premier League.

Achievements
Benin Premier League: 1:1984

Performance in CAF competitions
CAF Champions League: 1 appearance
1985 African Cup of Champions Clubs – Preliminary Round

Stadium
Currently the team plays at the Stade Charles de Gaulle.

References

External links

Football clubs in Benin